Pityohyphantes, commonly known as hammock spiders,  is a genus of sheet weavers that was first described by Eugène Louis Simon in 1929. The name comes from the Ancient Greek  (pitys), meaning "pine", and hyphantes, meaning "weaver".

Species
 it contains sixteen species and two subspecies, found in Europe and Eastern Europe:
Pityohyphantes alticeps Chamberlin & Ivie, 1943 – USA, Canada
Pityohyphantes brachygynus Chamberlin & Ivie, 1942 – USA, Canada
Pityohyphantes costatus (Hentz, 1850) – USA, Canada
Pityohyphantes c. annulipes (Banks, 1892) – North America
Pityohyphantes cristatus Chamberlin & Ivie, 1942 – USA, Canada
Pityohyphantes c. coloradensis Chamberlin & Ivie, 1942 – USA
Pityohyphantes hesperus (Chamberlin, 1920) – USA
Pityohyphantes kamela Chamberlin & Ivie, 1943 – USA, Canada
Pityohyphantes limitaneus (Emerton, 1915) – USA, Canada
Pityohyphantes lomondensis Chamberlin & Ivie, 1941 – USA
Pityohyphantes minidoka Chamberlin & Ivie, 1943 – USA, Canada
Pityohyphantes navajo Chamberlin & Ivie, 1942 – USA
Pityohyphantes palilis (L. Koch, 1870) – Central, Eastern Europe
Pityohyphantes pallidus Chamberlin & Ivie, 1942 – USA
Pityohyphantes phrygianus (C. L. Koch, 1836) (type) – Europe, Russia to Kazakhstan, Japan
Pityohyphantes rubrofasciatus (Keyserling, 1886) – USA, Canada
Pityohyphantes subarcticus Chamberlin & Ivie, 1943 – Canada, USA (Alaska)
Pityohyphantes tacoma Chamberlin & Ivie, 1942 – USA

See also
 List of Linyphiidae species (I–P)

External links
Image of a female P. tacoma

References

Araneomorphae genera
Linyphiidae
Spiders of North America